The Oberjoch Pass (1178 m) is a mountain pass in the Allgäu Alps just one kilometre west of the Austrian border. It links Bad Hindelang, Schattwald and Jungholz. 
Between 1938 and 1945 the pass was called "Adolf-Hitler-Pass".

See also
 List of highest paved roads in Europe
 List of mountain passes

Mountain passes of Bavaria
Mountain passes of the Alps